Wu Chongkui (born 29 March 1989, in Jiangsu) is a male Chinese rower, who has competed for Team China at the 2008 Summer Olympics.

Major performances
2005 National Games – 1st LM2X;
2006 World Championships – 1st lightweight fours;
2007 World Cup Leg 1/2 – 1st lightweight fours;
2007 World Championships – 5th lightweight fours;
2008 World Cup Leg 1 – 1st lightweight fours

References

1989 births
Living people
Chinese male rowers
Olympic rowers of China
Rowers from Jiangsu
Rowers at the 2008 Summer Olympics
Asian Games medalists in rowing
Rowers at the 2006 Asian Games
Asian Games gold medalists for China
Medalists at the 2006 Asian Games
World Rowing Championships medalists for China
20th-century Chinese people
21st-century Chinese people